The Corner Hotel in the Melbourne suburb of Richmond, Victoria, Australia, is a remodelled 19th-century pub which has been a live music venue since the 1940s and, since 1995, a popular rock music venue and rooftop bar.

History

1871-1983
In 1871, the premises was licensed to David and Jane McCormick. Business thrived because of the close proximity to the Richmond railway station. In 1881 it was renovated by William Malone, who improved both the accommodation and the liquor quality. Malone was the licensee until 1895. Between 1895 and 1929 the hotel changed hands seven times. From 1929 to 1935 it was operated by Nelly O'Connor and her husband.

The pub is thought to have begun presenting live music during the 1940s jazz era. During the 1950s it was owned by the Melbourne Cooperative Brewing Company, an offshoot of Carlton and United Breweries. They rebuilt the hotel in 1954,  obtaining permits to serve alcohol during the reconstruction. This was the peak time of an Australian custom known as the six o'clock swill, where venues were required to stop serving alcohol at 6 p.m. This law was a relic of World War I and operated from 1915 until its abolition in the mid-1960s (1966 in Victoria). It meant that workers would rush to pubs after finishing work and consume as much alcohol as possible before the bar closed.

In 1966 the pub was demolished and rebuilt in a slightly shifted location, to make space for the widening of the railway lines.

1984-1995
Brian Hartung from Carlton United Breweries approached Wayne Gale in 1984 and asked if he could start music at The Corner Hotel. At that time Gale was running venues at The John Barleycorn Hotel in Collingwood, The Tiger Lounge (Royal Oak in Richmond) and The Prospect Hill Hotel in Kew.

The first bands to play the venue were The Adventure and Big Music Works on Friday 28 February 1983 with Big Pig following on the Saturday night. At first live music was played only on Friday and Saturday nights. During the period that Wayne Gale was the owner, the cream of Australia's music industry played there and at one point he achieved 15 full houses in 16 days. This was an outstanding achievement considering the strength and fierce competition in the Melbourne music industry at the time. Bands such as Johnny Diesel & The Injectors, Spy vs Spy and Baby Animals all used the venue to build their profile in Melbourne. Both Mick Jagger and David Gilmour performed separate, unannounced, shows during 1988.

Other bands such as The Saints, The Stems and Ups & Downs also played the venue during this time.

1996-present 
Owners Tim Northeast & Mathew Everett took the reins of the Corner in the mid 1990s.

The Corner has also played host to a number of significant moments in music history. The White Stripes created the riff to Seven Nation Army during their soundcheck in 2003. In 2006 U2 filmed a video for their single Window in the Skies in the band room and rooftop garden of the hotel. Crowded House chose the venue for their final Melbourne show in 1996, though they later reformed. The Living End used footage from their 1997 Corner show for the film clip to Second Solution.

The venue was one of the first in 2005 to make all shows smoke-free and has also been stamping out sexual assault and harassment, and unspecified environmental initiatives.

The Corner Hotel launched the Corner Award in 2016, an annual award for local artists. Previous recipients of the Award include Sampa The Great, Cable Ties and Baker Boy.

The Corner has received a number of accolades over the years including Music Victoria Best Venue 2013–2018, NLMAs Victoria Venue of the Year 2016, and AHA National Awards for Excellence - Best Entertainment Venue 2019, AHA VIC State Awards for Excellence - Best Live Entertainment Venue 2017 & 2018. It has also held its place as the top Australian venue in the Pollstar Top 100 Global Club Venues since 2013, the highest placement being #13.

Artists that have played the Corner include:Airbourne, Alison Wonderland, Amity Affliction, Amy Shark, Architecture In Helsinki, Band Of Horses, Ben Harper, Biffy Clyro, Big Scary, Birds Of Tokyo, Black Lips, Black Rebel Motorcycle Club, Blink 182, Bliss N Eso, Boy & Bear, Cat Power, Charles Bradley, COG, Courtney Barnett, Crowded House, David Hasselhoff, Deftones, Diesel, Derrick May, Dinosaur Jr, Diplo, Dropkick Murphys, Easy Star All Stars, First Aid Kit, Flight Facilities, Frente, Future Of The Left, Grimes, Grizzly Bear, Hilltop Hoods, Hot Water Music, Hozier, Interpol, Jebediah, Jimmy Cliff, Joan Jett, Joe Strummer, John Butler Trio, King Krule, Lorde, Magic Dirt, Me First & The Gimme Gimmes, Midnight Oil, Ministry, Morcheeba, Mr Bungle, Mutemath, Northeast Party House, Northlane, Nothing But Thieves, Opeth, Paul Kelly, Peaches, Pennywise, Pinch Points, Public Enemy, Queens Of The Stone Age, Rocket From The Crypt, Rodriguez, Rowland S. Howard, Sam Fender, Sharon Jones, Shellac, Shlomo, SIA, Silversun Pickups, Something For Kate, Spiderbait, Spoon, Steve Earle, Swans, Tallest Man On Earth, Tame Impala, Tash Sultana, Tex Perkins, The Avalanches, The Black Keys, Michelle Shocked, The Bronx, The Darkness, The Drones, The Hives, The Horrors, The Libertines, The Living End, The Misfits, The Rapture, The White Stripes, Trophy Eyes, Vance Joy, Vengaboys, Violent Femmes, Wanda Jackson, Weddings Parties Everything, Xavier Rudd, You Am I.

Awards

Music Victoria Awards
The Music Victoria Awards are an annual awards night celebrating Victorian music. They commenced in 2006. The award for Best Venue was introduced in 2016.

! 
|-
| Music Victoria Awards of 2016
| Corner Hotel
| Best Venue (Over 500 Capacity)
| 
|rowspan="5"| 
|-
| Music Victoria Awards of 2017
| Corner Hotel
| Best Venue (Over 500 Capacity)
| 
|-
| Music Victoria Awards of 2018
| Corner Hotel
| Best Venue (Over 500 Capacity)
| 
|-
| Music Victoria Awards of 2019
| Corner Hotel
| Best Venue (Over 500 Capacity)
| 
|-
| Music Victoria Awards of 2020
| Corner Hotel
| Best Venue (Over 500 Capacity)
| 
|-
| 2021 Music Victoria Awards
| Corner Hotel
| Best Venue (Over 500 Capacity)
| 
| 
|-

References

External links
 
20 Years Of Melbourne's Favourite Venue, The Corner- Interviews in ToneDeaf Magazine 
Statement of Significance from the Heritage Council of Victoria

Pubs in Melbourne
Music venues in Melbourne
1871 establishments in Australia
Hotel buildings completed in 1871
Buildings and structures in the City of Yarra